St Edmund's Church, Holme Pierrepont is a parish church in the Church of England in Holme Pierrepont, Nottinghamshire.

The church is Grade I listed by the Department for Digital, Culture, Media and Sport as a building of outstanding architectural or historic interest.

History 
The church has had a long association with Holme Pierrepont Hall.

The medieval church was largely re-built in 1666 by Henry Pierrepont, 1st Marquess of Dorchester. In 1878 Thomas Chambers Hine added the chancel.

It is now part of the combined parish of All Hallows Church, Lady Bay.

Rectors 
 John Speed, 1578–1626
 Humphrey Perkins ca. 1718
 Samuel Berdmore 1719–1722 also Vicar of St Mary's Church, Nottingham
 ?
 Scrope Berdmore 1740–1770 also Vicar of St Mary's Church, Nottingham
 Thomas Donnithorne ???? - 1814
 James Jarvis Cleaver 1814–????
 Rev. James Jarvis Peach ???? - 1864?
 Henry Seymour

 Egbert Hacking ca. 1908–???? also from 1913 Archdeacon of Newark
 Rev WT Saward 1913-? Nottingham Newspaper, Nov 1921
 Canon R. P. Tinsley 1959–????

Monuments 

 Sir Henry Pierrepont, died 1499.
 Sir Henry Pierrepont, died 1615, father of Earl of Kingston upon Hull and Grace, Lady Manners
 Gertrude, wife of Robert Pierrepont, 1st Earl of Kingston-upon-Hull who died in 1649.
 John Oldham (poet)
 Evelyn Pierrepont

Stained glass 
The east window of 1913 is by James Powell and Sons.

Organ 
The organ was built by Charles Lloyd (organ builder) and won a gold medal at the Birmingham Trades Exhibition in 1865.

Organists 
 Robert Bullock 1925 - ????

References 

Church of England church buildings in Nottinghamshire
Grade I listed churches in Nottinghamshire